Agustín Coscia (8 April 1997) is an Argentine footballer who plays as a striker for UD Alzira.

Club career 

Coscia is a youth exponent from Rosario Central. He made his league debut on 7 August 2016 against Defensa y Justicia. He replaced Teófilo Gutiérrez after 73 minutes.

References

1997 births
Living people
Argentine footballers
Argentine expatriate footballers
Footballers from Rosario, Santa Fe
Association football forwards
Argentine Primera División players
Primera Nacional players
Segunda División B players
Rosario Central footballers
Club Almagro players
Zamora CF footballers
UD Alzira footballers
Argentine expatriate sportspeople in Spain
Expatriate footballers in Spain